The 1897 East Denbighshire by-election was a parliamentary by-election held for the House of Commons constituency of East Denbighshire in Wales on 28 September 1897.

Vacancy
The by-election was caused by the death of the sitting Liberal MP, George Osborne Morgan.

Candidates
Two candidates were nominated by the Tories and the Liberals.

The Liberal Party nominated Samuel Moss, a barrister.

The Conservative Party nominated George Thomas Kenyon, a barrister and former and future MP for Denbigh Boroughs.

References

1897 elections in the United Kingdom
1897 in Wales
1890s elections in Wales
September 1897 events
History of Denbighshire